General elections were held in India between 5 September and 3 October 1999, a few months after the Kargil War. Results were announced on 6 October 1999.

The elections saw the National Democratic Alliance led by the Bharatiya Janata Party win a majority in the Lok Sabha, the first time since 1984 that a party or alliance had won an outright majority and the second since the 1977 elections that a non-Congress coalition had done so. The elections gave Atal Bihari Vajpayee the record of being the first non-Congress Prime Minister to serve a full five-year term. The decisive result also ended the political instability the country had seen since 1996. The Indian National Congress' 114 seat tally was its worst-ever performance in a general election until it surpassed by the 2014 and 2019 general elections.

Background

1999 Lok Sabha vote of confidence
On 17 April 1999, the Bharatiya Janata Party (BJP) coalition government led by prime minister Atal Bihari Vajpayee failed to win a confidence vote in the Lok Sabha (India's lower house) by a single vote due to the withdrawal of one of the government's coalition partners – the All India Anna Dravida Munnetra Kazhagam (AIADMK). The general secretary of the AIADMK J. Jayalalithaa, had consistently threatened to withdraw support from the ruling coalition if certain demands were not met, in particular the sacking of the Tamil Nadu government, control of which she had lost three years prior. The BJP accused Jayalalithaa of making the demands in order to avoid standing trial for a series of corruption charges, and no agreement between the parties could be reached leading to the government's defeat.

Sonia Gandhi, as leader of the opposition and largest opposition party (Indian National Congress) was unable to form a coalition of parties large enough to secure a working majority in the Lok Sabha. Thus shortly after the no confidence motion, President K. R. Narayanan dissolved the Parliament and called fresh elections. Atal Bihari Vajpayee remained caretaker prime minister till the elections were held later that year.

Campaign
The incumbent Bharatiya Janata Party (BJP) went into the election as the head of the National Democratic Alliance (NDA), a coalition of over 20 parties. Several other parties in the election not part of the NDA also committed themselves to supporting a BJP led government on matters of confidence.
The main opposition league was led by Sonia Gandhi's Indian National Congress, the long-traditional centrist dominant party in India. The opposition coalition comprised far fewer parties, and its alliances were generally weaker than those of the NDA.
A so-called "third front" of left-wing, socialist and communist parties was also present, although this was not a strong electoral alliance so much as a loose grouping of parties that shared similar ideological viewpoints and had some inter-party co-operation. There were also nearly one thousand candidates of unaffiliated parties, independent candidates and parties who were unwilling to take part in coalitions that stood in the election.

The campaign coalesced around a few key issues. Sonia Gandhi was a relative newcomer to the INC (having been elected to the presidency in 1998) and her leadership had recently been challenged by Maharastrian INC leader Sharad Pawar, on the grounds of her Italian birth. This led to an underlying crisis within the INC that persisted during the election and was capitalised upon by the BJP, which contrasted the "videsi" (foreign) Gandhi versus the "swadesi" (home-grown) Vajpayee.
Another issue running in the BJP's favour was the generally positive view of Vajpayee's handling of the Kargil War, which had ended a few months earlier and had affirmed and strengthened the Indian position in Kashmir.  During the past two years India had posted strong economic growth on the back of economic liberalisation and financial reforms, as well as a low rate of inflation and higher rate of industrial expansion. The BJP campaigned strongly on the back of these achievements, as well as cultivating some sympathy for the predicament which had led to the government's downfall.

Perhaps most decisive though in the BJP's campaign was the solid alliance it had cultivated and the relatively strong performance it was able to deliver on regional and local issues.  The 1991, 1996, and 1998 elections saw a period of consistent growth for the BJP and its allies, based primarily on political expansions in terms of cultivating stronger and broader alliances with other previously unaffiliated parties; and regional expansion which had seen the NDA become competitive and even the largest vote takers in previously Congress dominated areas such as Orissa, Andhra Pradesh and Assam. These final factors were to prove decisive in the election outcome of 1999.

The voting was conducted over five days. Elections were conducted in 146 seats on the Eastern coast of the country on 5 September, in 123 Central and Southern seats on 11 September, in 76 Northern and Upper-Central seats on 18 September, in 74 North Western seats on 25 September and in the 121 Western seats on 3 October. Despite some fears of voter fatigue, electoral turnout was comparable with previous elections at 59.99%. Over 5 million election officials conducted the election over 800,000 polling stations, with vote counting commencing on 6 October.

Results
The results in terms of seats were decisively in favour of the BJP and the NDA, with the formal NDA picking up 269 seats, and a further 29 seats taken by the Telugu Desam Party, which gave support to the BJP-led government but was not strictly part of its alliance. The Congress party lost 23 seats, and its two key regional allies performed worse than expected, however it did regain ground in some states such as Uttar Pradesh (where it had been wiped out in 1998, not winning a single seat in the state). The leftist parties' fortunes continued to decline, with the Communist Party of India dropping to just four seats and losing its official status as a "national party".

The seat result for the Indian National Congress was the worst in nearly half a century, with party leader Sonia Gandhi calling upon the party to take a frank assessment of itself – "the result calls for introspection, frank assessment and determined action. We will attend to this in the coming days. In the meantime, we accept unhesitatingly the verdict of the people". For the BJP, this marked the first occasion where a non-INC party had secured a stable government coalition. Previous non-INC governing coalitions had been formed in 1977, 1989 and 1996; however none of these administrations had been able to maintain a stable coagulation for more than a couple of years. One Senior BJP figure commented in the aftermath "It will certainly be a government of stability...I expect that Mr Vajpayee, with all his experience, will be able to handle our coalition partners."

By state

Support for the New Government

References

 
India
September 1999 events in Asia
October 1999 events in Asia
General elections in India